This is a list of secondary highways in Nipissing District, many of which serve as logging roads or provide access to Algonquin Park and sparsely populated areas in the Nipissing District of northeastern Ontario.

Highway 523 

Secondary Highway 523, commonly referred to as Highway 523, is a provincially maintained highway in the Canadian province of Ontario. The highway begins at the Nipissing-Hastings boundary, where it continues south to Highway 127. It ends at Highway 60 in the village of Madawaska.

Highway 531 

Secondary Highway 531, commonly referred to as Highway 531, is a provincially maintained secondary highway in the Canadian province of Ontario. It connects Highway 17 east of North Bay with the community of Bonfield. The  route was established in 1956, and has remained the same since then. It passes through a forested area and has several private residences located along its length. Aside from Maple Road, its southern terminus, and Highway 17, its northern terminus, Highway 531 encounters no roads along its length.

Highway 533 

Secondary Highway 533, commonly referred to as Highway 533, is a provincially maintained secondary highway in the Canadian province of Ontario. The route begins in the town of Mattawa, at Highway 17, and travels north to Highway 63.

Highway 539 

Secondary Highway 539, commonly referred to as Highway 539, is a secondary highway in the Canadian province of Ontario, located within the Sudbury and Nipissing Districts.

A spur route, Highway 539A, extends northwesterly from Highway 539 at River Valley.

Highway 539A 

Secondary Highway 539A, commonly referred to as Highway 539A, is a provincially maintained secondary highway in the Canadian province of Ontario, located within Nipissing District. At this point, the roadway turns northward and continues as Highway 805.

Highway 575 

Secondary Highway575, commonly referred to as Highway575, is a secondary highway in the Canadian province of Ontario, located within Nipissing District.

Highway 630 

Secondary Highway 630, commonly referred to as Highway 630, is a secondary highway in the Canadian province of Ontario. It provides access to Algonquin Provincial Park from the north at Kioshkakwi Lake. It was assumed as a provincial route on July28, 1961, by which time it was paved north of Eau Claire.

Highway 656 

Secondary Highway 656, commonly referred to as Highway 656, is a secondary highway in the Canadian province of Ontario. It was established on April8, 1965.

References 

 
Roads in Nipissing District